Wallmapuwen ("Fellow citizens of the Mapuche country" in English) is a Mapuche political organization trying to establish itself as a political party in the Chilean legal system. Its political ideology is generally based on leftism, democracy, Mapuche nationalism, self-determination and secular government.

The political party was founded in 2006 and advocates for self-governance and autonomy for Mapuche people. In 2016 it was officially recognized by the Electoral Service of Chile.

Notes

External links
Official site of Wallmapuwen

2006 establishments in Chile
Mapuche conflict
Mapuche organizations
Political parties in Chile